Kaieteur Airport  is an airport serving  Kaieteur National Park in the Potaro-Siparuni region of Guyana.

Airlines and destinations

See also

Transport in Guyana
List of airports in Guyana

References

External links
OpenStreetMap - Kaieteur
SkyVector - Kaieteur

Airports in Guyana